Barnett Township is the name of a few townships in the United States:

Barnett Township, Arkansas in Van Buren County, Arkansas
Barnett Township, DeWitt County, Illinois 
Barnett Township, Roseau County, Minnesota
Barnett Township, Forest County, Pennsylvania
Barnett Township, Jefferson County, Pennsylvania

Township name disambiguation pages